Samandere Waterfall is a waterfall in Düzce Province, northwestern Turkey. It is the first ever registered natural monument of the country.

Location and access

In 2016, the municipality of Düzce launched free-of-charge transportation by bus to the waterfall from the city center on daily basis during the summer months.

Waterfall
The waterfall is on a tributary of Uğur Creek, which flows into Lake  Efteni. There is a cave in upstream of the waters forming the waterfall, which submerge and outcrop there. The area consists of monumental trees along the -long stream, three waterfalls and a deep canyon called "Cadı Kazanı" (literally: Witches Cauldron). The site is a popular visitor attraction, which offers campsites, picnicking areas and hiking trails for outdoor recreation. The waterfall site features a footbridge and observation decks with railing. 

The natural monument is run by the Municipality of Düzce according to a protocol signed later by the parts.

The waterfall sustained great damage following a flood disaster occurred on July 16–17, 2009. It was restored after maintenance works in 2009 and 2010.

References

Waterfalls of Turkey
Landforms of Düzce Province
Natural monuments of Turkey
Tourist attractions in Düzce Province
Protected areas established in 1988
1988 establishments in Turkey